Abdelhafid Bellabès (born November 4, 1959) is a former Algerian international football player. He played essentially for MC Oran. He took part in the 1979 FIFA World Youth Championship in Japan with Algeria U-20 team.

Honours

Clubs
MC Oran
Algerian Championship: Champion 1988 ; Runner-up 1985, 1987
Algerian Cup: Winner 1984, 1985

National
African Youth Championship: Winner 1979
FIFA World Youth Championship: Quarter-final 1979

References

1959 births
Living people
Footballers from Oran
Algerian footballers
Algeria international footballers
MC Oran players
Ligue 1 players
Association football defenders
21st-century Algerian people